Ingemar Teever (born 24 February 1983) is an Estonian former professional footballer who last played as a forward for Estonian Meistriliiga club Levadia.

Teever was the top goalscorer in the 2008 and the 2015 Meistriliiga seasons. Teever was named Meistriliiga Player of the Year in 2015.

Club career
At the age of 19, Teever started his professional career with TVMK, having previously played for lower division clubs Nõmme Kalju and M.C. Tallinn. There he won the 2005 Meistriliiga, Estonian Cup in 2003 and Estonian Supercup in 2005, before leaving the club in 2005.

Öster
On 1 December 2015, Teever joined Swedish Allsvenskan club Öster. His first appearances for Öster were very promising, but as competitive matches approached, Teever's scoring record decreased rapidly. Teever scored a total of only five goals during his two seasons in Sweden, despite playing regularly.

Nõmme Kalju
Teever joined newly promoted Nõmme Kalju on loan after Öster were relegated to Swedish Swedish football Division 1. He became an instant hit, scoring 23 goals in 35 matches, winning the top goalscorer award, and driving the team to the 4th place, just a point behind the third, Trans Narva. After the first season back in Estonia, the player signed a permanent deal. Then he was hit by a knee injury leaving him sidelined for the first half of the season. Teever returned for only 6 appearances, when he injured his neck in a life-threatening pool accident, but made a full recovery and returned for the 2010 season.

Pfullendorf
On 29 July 2010 it was announced that Ingemar Teever joined German Regionalliga Süd club Pfullendorf. He spent two years in Germany, scoring ten goals in 51 matches.

Levadia
After his contract expired in May 2012, Teever returned to Estonia and joined Nõmme Kalju's beach soccer team. He was also part of Estonian national team that played 2013 FIFA Beach Soccer World Cup qualification matches in Moscow in the beginning of July. Teever then signed a year-and-a-half long contract with Levadia and was instantly added to the UEFA Europa League squad. He also got offers from Finland and Germany, but decided to stay in Estonia so he could have better chance to return to the national team. On 19 July 2012, Teever made his debut for Levadia when he came on as a second-half substitute in a Europa League match against Cypriot side Anorthosis. He opened his goal scoring tally on his Meistriliiga debut on 23 July 2012, when his injury time free kick found the net against Tallinna Kalev.

International career
Teever made his international debut for the Estonia national football team on 29 March 2003 in a friendly match against Canada.

International goals
Estonia score listed first, score column indicates score after each Teever goal.

Honours

Club
TVMK
Meistriliiga: 2005
Estonian Cup: 2002–03
Estonian Supercup: 2005

Levadia
 Meistriliiga: 2013, 2014
 Estonian Cup: 2013–14
 Estonian Supercup: 2013, 2015

Individual
 Meistriliiga Player of the Year: 2015
 Meistriliiga top goalscorer: 2008, 2015

References

External links

1983 births
Living people
People from Saue Parish
Estonian footballers
Association football forwards
Estonia international footballers
Estonian expatriate footballers
FC TVMK players
Meistriliiga players
Östers IF players
Nõmme Kalju FC players
Expatriate footballers in Sweden
Estonian expatriate sportspeople in Sweden
Allsvenskan players
Expatriate footballers in Germany
Estonian expatriate sportspeople in Germany
SC Pfullendorf players
FCI Levadia Tallinn players
FCI Levadia U21 players